Phruensis is a fungal genus in the family Valsaceae. It is monotypic, containing the single species Phruensis brunneispora, found on decaying trunks of the palm Licuala longecalycata in Thailand. The species was described as new to science in 2004.

References

External links

Aquatic fungi
Taxa described in 2004
Fungi of Asia
Diaporthales
Monotypic Sordariomycetes genera